The Howard Centre is a shopping centre in Welwyn Garden City. It is named after Sir Ebenezer Howard, founder of the garden city movement.

History
It was built by Tarmac Construction and opened in October 1990. It was owned and managed by Slough Estates from 1990 until 2004 when ownership transferred to Land Securities. Land Securities managed the centre until its disposal in October 2009 to LaSalle who have owned and managed it since.

Description
The centre provides  of space set across two levels; anchor tenants include Boots, WHSmith, Monsoon and H&M. In April 2022, the then largest anchor store Marks & Spencer (occupying  split across both floors at the centre's northern end) closed their Howard Centre branch and relocated to Stevenage.

Connections

The centre has direct access to Welwyn Garden City railway station, along with a ticket office within the centre itself, and is adjacent to the town's bus station. It is complemented by the older John Lewis store which is outside the centre but only a few minutes walk away, on Bridge Road.

See also
 Ebenezer Howard
 Garden city movement
 LaSalle
 Welwyn Garden City
 Welwyn Garden City railway station

References

External links
 Howard Centre website
 LaSalle website

Shopping centres in Hertfordshire
Buildings and structures in Hertfordshire
Shopping malls established in 1990
Welwyn Garden City